Macteola theskela is a species of sea snail, a marine gastropod mollusk in the family Mangeliidae.

Description
The length of the shell attains 7.5 mm, its diameter 3 mm.

(Original description) The inner or columellar margin of the lip possesses seven or eight close and minute plicae.  There is also one minute process at the parietal sinus. It is of a graceful attenuate fusiform shell, six-whorled, or perhaps seven, but the apex is broken off in the only specimen we have. It shows longitudinal ribs crossed by many lirae. The aperture is oblong. 
The pure whiteness of the shell is relieved by a row of brown spots between the ribs just above the sutures and in the middle of the body whorl.

Distribution
This marine species occurs off Queensland, Australia, Vanuatu and the Loyalty Islands

References

 Habe, T. 1964. Shells of the Western Pacific in color. Osaka : Hoikusha Vol. 2 233 pp., 66 pls.
 Liu J.Y. [Ruiyu] (ed.). (2008). Checklist of marine biota of China seas. China Science Press. 1267 pp.

External links
  Tucker, J.K. 2004 Catalog of recent and fossil turrids (Mollusca: Gastropoda). Zootaxa 682:1-1295.
  Hedley, C. 1922. A revision of the Australian Turridae. Records of the Australian Museum 13(6): 213-359, pls 42-56  
 MNHN, Paris: Macteola theskela

theskela
Gastropods described in 1895